United States v. Wheeler, 435 U.S. 313 (1978), was a United States Supreme Court case in which the Court held the Double Jeopardy Clause does not bar the federal prosecution of a Native American (Indian) who has already been prosecuted by the tribe.

Background 
In 1974, Anthony Robert Wheeler, a member of the Navajo tribe, was charged with disorderly conduct through the tribal justice system.  On October 18, 1974, Wheeler pleaded guilty to that charge and to contributing to the delinquency of a minor. Wheeler was sentenced to 15 days in jail or a fine of $30 on the disorderly conduct, and 60 days in jail or a fine of $120 on the second charge.

On November 19, 1975, a federal grand jury indicted Wheeler for statutory rape, based on the same incident, and Wheeler moved to quash the indictment based on double jeopardy.  The United States District Court dismissed the indictment. The Ninth Circuit Court of Appeals affirmed the dismissal, concluding that tribal courts and federal district courts were arms of the same sovereign.

Opinion of the Court 
Justice Potter Stewart delivered the opinion of a unanimous court.  Stewart noted that the issue was whether an Indian tribe had the inherent sovereignty to punish tribal members for offenses.  He observed that unless the power was withdrawn by treaty or statute, the tribe retained that authority.  Since the Navajo tribe had never given up that authority and Congress had not withdrawn it by statute, the tribe could punish its member for a violation of law.

Since this authority was separate from federal authority, the tribe was acting as an independent sovereign. The double jeopardy clause does not prohibit prosecution by two separate sovereigns.  The Court reversed and remanded the decision of the lower courts, and allowed the prosecution of Wheeler.

References

External links
 

1978 in United States case law
United States Supreme Court cases
United States Supreme Court cases of the Burger Court
United States Fifth Amendment case law